Carrie Mae Pittman Meek (April 29, 1926November 28, 2021) was the United States Representative for Florida's 17th congressional district, from 1993 to 2003. Having been elected in the September 1992 primary with no general election opponent, she was the first African American since the Reconstruction era elected to represent Florida in the United States Congress, where she advocated for the poor and for members of minority groups. An educator, legislator, stateswoman and a member of the Democratic Party, she served from 1979 to 1982 in the Florida House of Representatives, from 1982 to 1992 in the Florida Senate, and from 1993 to 2003, as a congresswoman in the United States House of Representatives. She was the founder of the Carrie Meek Foundation.

Early life and education 
Carrie Mae Pittman was born on April 29, 1926, in Tallahassee, Florida, where she was raised, the youngest of 12 children of Willie and Carrie Pittman. She was the daughter of sharecroppers and granddaughter of a slave.

Meek was a graduate of Lincoln High School. She remained in north Florida for college and was graduated from Florida A&M University (a historically black university then known as Florida A&M College for Negroes) in 1946. Her degree was in physical education and biology, and she also lettered in track and field. At that time, African Americans were not admitted to graduate schools in Florida, so Meek enrolled in the University of Michigan and received her master of science degree in 1948.

Academic career 
After graduation from the University of Michigan, Meek was hired as a teacher at Bethune-Cookman College, another historically black college in Daytona Beach, Florida. Following that, she taught at her alma mater, Florida A&M University. Meek moved to Miami in 1961 to serve as special assistant to the vice president of Miami-Dade Community College. Largely due to Meek's integral role in the administration of the college during the push for its integration, the college was desegregated in 1963.

Throughout her years as an educator, Meek was also active in community projects in the Miami area.

Political career

Florida Legislature 
When state representative Gwen Cherry, Florida's first woman African American legislator, died in a car crash in 1979, Meek decided to run in the special election to succeed her. She was elected to the Florida House as a Democrat. As a state representative, she introduced a bill criminalizing stalking. She served until 1982.

In 1982, Meek ran for a newly drawn state senate seat based in northern Dade County. She became the first African American woman elected to the Florida Senate. As a state senator, Meek served on the education appropriations subcommittee. Her efforts in the legislature led to the construction of thousands of affordable rental housing units.

U.S. House of Representatives 
In 1992, a court-ordered congressional redistricting plan drew three districts with a substantial African American population that were designed to elect black candidates of choice to comply with the federal Voting Rights Act. Meek ran for one of those seats, the 17th district, which was based in northern Dade County. Along with Corrine Brown and Alcee Hastings, Meek became the first black member of Congress from Florida since Post-Civil War Reconstruction Era.

Upon taking office, Meek faced the task of helping her district recover from Hurricane Andrew's devastation. Her efforts as the only freshman Democrat on the  House Appropriations Committee helped to provide $100 million in federal assistance to rebuild Dade County. Also while in the House, Meek successfully focused her attention on issues such as economic development, health care, education, and housing. She led legislation through Congress to improve Dade County's transit system, airport, and seaport; to construct a new family and childcare center in northern Dade County; and to fund advanced aviation training programs at Miami-Dade Community College. Meek emerged as a strong advocate for Haitian immigrants and senior citizens.

Meek believed that her district was undercounted in the 1990 Census and that the votes of her constituents were not represented correctly in the 2000 presidential election. Meek and other members of the U.S. House of Representatives objected to the 25 electoral votes from Florida that George W. Bush narrowly won after a contentious recount. Because no U.S. senator joined her objection, it had to be dismissed during the certification of the votes of the Electoral College by Vice President Al Gore while he was overseeing the recount that was his vice presidential role in the senate. Gore had been Bush's opponent in the race.

Meek never lost a race for reelection to the U.S. House of Representatives. She announced that she would not seek re-election in the 2002 election, and retired from the House at the end of her term in January 2003. Her son, Kendrick Meek, ran for her vacated seat and succeeded her.

Personal life 

Meek was married twice. Her husbands were Lucius Davis and Harold Meek. Both marriages ended in divorce. She had three children, two daughters, Lucia Davis-Raiford and Sheila Davis, and a son, Kendrick Meek.

Renown for liberal opinions, folksy yet powerful oratory, and colorful Republican bashing, once while discussing why she was a Democrat, she said, “The last Republican that did something for me was Abraham Lincoln”.

After her retirement from politics, she spent much of her time running the Carrie Meek Foundation, which she had founded in 2001 to provide resources and opportunities for those living in her Miami-Dade community. She stepped down for health reasons in 2015.

She died at her home in Miami on November 28, 2021, at the age of 95.

Awards and honors 
The Carrie Meek – James N. Eaton, Sr. Southeastern Regional Black Archives Research Center and Museum in Tallahassee, Florida, on the campus of Florida A&M University, was co-named in Meek's honor.

She was a member of Delta Sigma Theta sorority, and an honorary member of Iota Phi Lambda sorority.

Meek was also awarded honorary degrees by a number of institutions, including Florida A&M University, University of Miami, Barry University, Florida Atlantic University, and Rollins College.

Electoral history 

Write-in and minor candidate notes:  In 1992, write-ins received 15 votes. In 1994, write-ins received 11 votes. In 1996, write-ins received two votes. In 1998, the election was uncontested with no write-ins, so Meek's vote total was not recorded. In 2000, write-ins received three votes.

See also 
 List of African-American United States representatives
 Women in the United States House of Representatives

References

External links 

 US House of Representatives: History, Art & Archives: 
 

1926 births
2021 deaths
20th-century African-American educators
20th-century African-American women
21st-century African-American women
21st-century African-American politicians
21st-century American politicians
21st-century American women politicians
African-American members of the United States House of Representatives
African-American state legislators in Florida
African-American women in politics
Delta Sigma Theta members
Democratic Party members of the United States House of Representatives from Florida
Female members of the United States House of Representatives
Florida A&M University alumni
Democratic Party Florida state senators
Democratic Party members of the Florida House of Representatives
People from Tallahassee, Florida
University of Michigan alumni
Women state legislators in Florida
20th-century American women educators
20th-century American educators
21st-century American women educators
21st-century American educators
Florida A&M University faculty
Bethune–Cookman University people
Miami Dade College
Members of Congress who became lobbyists